Will Yip is a Grammy nominated American record producer, audio engineer, songwriter and musician. Yip is an owner of Studio 4 Recording in Conshohocken, Pennsylvania. Yip is also the owner of Memory Music, an independent record label he launched in June, 2015, featuring projects worked on at Studio 4.

Yip's partial discography includes producing, engineering, mixing, and mastering recordings for artists such as Lauryn Hill, Panic! at the Disco, Circa Survive, Code Orange, Anthony Green, Blacklisted, Title Fight, The Wonder Years, The Disco Biscuits, King Sunny Adé, The Fray, Keane, Balance and Composure, Superheaven, mewithoutYou, Movements, among others.

Yip is also a studio and live drummer. He was the drummer and music director for rapper Schoolly D and his band International Supersport. On October 8, 2013, Yip released a compilation entitled Off The Board: A Studio 4 Compilation. The compilation included unreleased songs from bands such as Title Fight, Tigers Jaw, Circa Survive, Pity Sex, Anthony Green and much more.

In early 2017,  Yip alongside Atlantic Records launched the imprint, "Black Cement Records", with the first release being Tigers Jaw's, Spin.

Partial discography

References

Year of birth missing (living people)
Living people
American audio engineers
Record producers from Pennsylvania
Songwriters from Pennsylvania
Central High School (Philadelphia) alumni